The Speckless Sky is an album by Jane Siberry. It was Siberry's highest-charting album on the Canadian charts and contains her biggest Top 40 hit, "One More Colour". The album's second single, "Map of the World (Part II)", was also a hit on Canada's adult contemporary charts.

Rheostatics recorded a cover of "One More Colour", with additional lyrics by Martin Tielli, on their 1995 album Introducing Happiness; Siberry and Tielli recorded a duet, "A Long Time Love Song", on the 1991 Bruce Cockburn tribute album Kick at the Darkness. Sarah Polley also performed a cover of "One More Colour" in the film The Sweet Hereafter.

After this album, Siberry's work was distributed outside of Canada by Reprise Records.

The Speckless Sky is no longer available on CD, but can be obtained via her store site on Bandcamp.

Reception
Keyboard compared Jane Siberry's sound to "Petula Clark trying to sound like Kate Bush", but praised the album for the "startling electronic orchestrations" featured in several tracks in the album.

Track listing
All songs by Jane Siberry.
 "One More Colour" – 4:38
 "Seven Steps to the Wall" – 5:11
 "The Very Large Hat" – 5:35
 "Vladimir • Vladimir" – 7:08
 "Mein Bitte" – 4:20
 "The Empty City" – 6:40
 "Map of the World (Part II)" – 5:07
 "The Taxi Ride" – 5:39

Personnel
Jane Siberry – vocals, keyboards, guitar
Al Cross – drums
Anne Bourne – keyboards
John Switzer – bass
Ken Myhr – guitar, guitar synth
Rob Yale – Fairlight CMI programming, keyboards
Additional personnel
Teddy Borowiecki – accordion on 4 7
Sarah McElcheran – trumpet on 7

Charts
Album

Singles

Certifications

Cover Versions

The Art Of Time Ensemble featuring (former Barenaked Ladies singer) Steven Page recorded The Taxi Ride for their 2010 album A Singer Must Die.

References

1985 albums
Jane Siberry albums
Windham Hill Records albums